The Amateur is an Argentine drama film released in 1999, written and directed by Juan Bautista Stagnaro.

The film was based on a novel by Mauricio Dayub.

The picture was nominated for five Silver Condor Awards.

Plot

On the outskirts of a provincial town, Pajaro is determined to enter the The Guinness Book of Records by breaking the longest bike-ride record.

He rides around the fountain in the square with the help of his friend, Lopecito. He is willing to face many challenges that face him, in attaining this new record.

Will this race open the path to love for him, and for his redemption?

Cast
 Mauricio Dayub as Alfonso "Pájaro" Romero
 Pedro Heredia as Ramón
 Vando Villamil as Lopecito
 Arturo Goetz as Concejal
 Cacho Espíndola as Intendente
 Alejandra Puy as La Mora
 Darío Grandinetti as Funcionario municipal

Exhibition
The film premiered on April 22, 1999 and was released in Canada at the Montreal World Film Festival and in America in Miami at the Hispanic Film Festival.

The film was produced by Aleph Producciones S.A. and distributed by Transeuropa Video Entertainment on VHS.

Footnotes

External links 
 

1999 films
Cycling films
1990s sports drama films
Films based on Argentine novels
Argentine independent films
1990s Spanish-language films
Argentine sports drama films
1999 independent films
1999 drama films
1990s Argentine films